Joseph Akongo is a retired Cameroonian professional footballer.

Career
Akongo played in Uruguay for Peñarol, and became the first African to score in a Copa Libertadores match for a Uruguayan team. Besides Cameroon, he has played in Uruguay.

References

Year of birth missing (living people)
Living people
Cameroonian footballers
Peñarol players
Association football forwards